This is a list of airlines which have an air operator's certificate issued by the Swedish Transport Agency of Sweden.

Scheduled airlines

Charter airlines

Cargo airlines

See also 
 List of defunct airlines in Sweden
List of defunct airlines of Europe
List of airlines

 
Airlines
Sweden
Airlines
Sweden